Linhe Township is a township under the administration of Xi County, Henan, China. , it has 15 villages under its administration.

References 

Township-level divisions of Henan
Xi County, Henan